Tukey's range test, also known as Tukey's test, Tukey method, Tukey's honest significance test, or Tukey's HSD (honestly significant difference) test, is a single-step multiple comparison procedure and statistical test. It can be used to find means that are significantly different from each other. 

Named after John Tukey, it compares all possible pairs of means, and is based on a studentized range distribution (q) (this distribution is similar to the distribution of t from the t-test. See below).

Tukey's test compares the means of every treatment to the means of every other treatment; that is, it applies simultaneously to the set of all pairwise comparisons

and identifies any difference between two means that is greater than the expected standard error. The confidence coefficient for the set, when all sample sizes are equal, is exactly   for any . For unequal sample sizes, the confidence coefficient is greater than 1 − α. In other words, the Tukey method is conservative when there are unequal sample sizes.

A common mistaken belief is that Tukey's HSD should only be used following a significant ANOVA. The ANOVA is not necessary because the Tukey test controls the Type I error rate on its own.

This test is often followed by the Compact Letter Display (CLD) statistical procedure to render the output of this test more transparent to non-statistician audiences.

Assumptions
The observations being tested are independent within and among the groups.
The groups associated with each mean in the test are normally distributed.
There is equal within-group variance across the groups associated with each mean in the test (homogeneity of variance).

The test statistic
Tukey's test is based on a formula very similar to that of the -test. In fact, Tukey's test is essentially a -test, except that it corrects for family-wise error rate.

The formula for Tukey's test is

where  is the larger of the two means being compared,  is the smaller of the two means being compared, and SE is the standard error of the sum of the means.

This  value can then be compared to a  value from the studentized range distribution. If the  value is larger than the critical value  obtained from the distribution, the two means are said to be significantly different at level 

Since the null hypothesis for Tukey's test states that all means being compared are from the same population (i.e.  =  =  = ... = ), the means should be normally distributed (according to the central limit theorem). This gives rise to the normality assumption of Tukey's test.

The studentized range (q) distribution
The Tukey method uses the studentized range distribution. Suppose that we take a sample of size n from each of k populations with the same normal distribution N(μ, σ2) and suppose that min is the smallest of these sample means and max is the largest of these sample means, and suppose S2 is the pooled sample variance from these samples. Then the following random variable has a Studentized range distribution.

This value of q is the basis of the critical value of q, based on three factors:
 α (the Type I error rate, or the probability of rejecting a true null hypothesis)
 k (the number of populations)
 df (the number of degrees of freedom (N – k) where N is the total number of observations)

The distribution of q has been tabulated and appears in many textbooks on statistics. In some tables the distribution of q has been tabulated without the  factor. To understand  which table it is, we can compute the result for k = 2 and compare it to the result of the Student's t-distribution with the same degrees of freedom and the same α.
In addition, R offers a cumulative distribution function (ptukey) and a quantile function (qtukey) for q.

Confidence limits
The Tukey confidence limits for all pairwise comparisons with confidence coefficient of at least 1 − α are

Notice that the point estimator and the estimated variance are the same as those for a single pairwise comparison. The only difference between the confidence limits for simultaneous comparisons and those for a single comparison is the multiple of the estimated standard deviation.

Also note that the sample sizes must be equal when using the studentized range approach.  is the standard deviation of the entire design, not just that of the two groups being compared. It is possible to work with unequal sample sizes. In this case, one has to calculate the estimated standard deviation for each pairwise comparison as formalized by Clyde Kramer in 1956, so the procedure for unequal sample sizes is sometimes referred to as the Tukey–Kramer method which is as follows:

where n i and n j are the sizes of groups i and j respectively.  The degrees of freedom for the whole design is also applied.

Comparing ANOVA and Tukey–Kramer tests
Both ANOVA and Tukey–Kramer tests are based on the same assumptions. However, these two tests for k groups (i.e.  =  = ... = ) may result in logical contradictions when k> 2, even if the assumptions hold.

See also
Family-wise error rate
Newman–Keuls method

Notes

Further reading
  Section 3.5.7.

External links
 NIST/SEMATECH e-Handbook of Statistical Methods: Tukey's method

Analysis of variance
Statistical tests
Multiple comparisons